Mario Klinger (born 27 December 1986 in Essen) is a German footballer who plays for SG Wattenscheid 09.

References

External links
 
 

1986 births
Living people
German footballers
Germany youth international footballers
Association football midfielders
Footballers from Essen
FC Schalke 04 players
FC Schalke 04 II players
KSV Hessen Kassel players
Rot-Weiss Essen players
1. FC Kaiserslautern II players
1. FC Kaiserslautern players
Rot-Weiß Oberhausen players
SV Eintracht Trier 05 players
FC 08 Homburg players
2. Bundesliga players
3. Liga players
Regionalliga players